Richland Township is one of the twenty townships of Darke County, Ohio, United States. The 2010 census found 841 people in the township.

Geography
Located in the central part of the county, it borders the following townships:
York Township - north
Wayne Township - northeast
Adams Township - southeast
Greenville Township - southwest
Brown Township - northwest

No municipalities are located in Richland Township, although several unincorporated communities lie there:
Beamsville, in the center, near the Stillwater River
Dawn, in the north
Stelvideo, in the south adjacent to the border with Adams Township

Name and history
Richland Township was established in 1820. Richland was noted for its fertile soil. It is one of twelve Richland Townships statewide.

Government
The township is governed by a three-member board of trustees, who are elected in November of odd-numbered years to a four-year term beginning on the following January 1. Two are elected in the year after the presidential election and one is elected in the year before it. There is also an elected township fiscal officer, who serves a four-year term beginning on April 1 of the year after the election, which is held in November of the year before the presidential election. Vacancies in the fiscal officership or on the board of trustees are filled by the remaining trustees.  The current trustees are Daniel Hart, Michael Oliver, and Bob Wagner, and the clerk is Sandra Marker.

References

External links
County website

Townships in Darke County, Ohio
Townships in Ohio